Nana Kwaku Bonsam (born 20 August 1973), whose name, "Bonsam" translates literally as "Devil", is a well known Ghanaian witch doctor and fetish priest.

Bonsam gained international notoriety when he claimed to put a voodoo curse on the Portuguese footballer Cristiano Ronaldo. Before taking his present name, he was originally called Stephen Osei Mensah, a member of the Seventh-day Adventist Church in the village of Afrancho. In 1992, when he was aged 19, he suffered severe burns in a gas explosion, after which his life underwent a transformation. Ptah Amissah-Aidoo changed his life. The controversial priest also claimed, in a self-made video, that he was responsible for the death of Pastor TB Joshua, after he was fought spiritually.

References

External links

 je9ewbb $¶#!///

1973 births
Living people
Ghanaian animists
People from Ashanti Region
Former Seventh-day Adventists